Parlick Fell may refer to:

Parlick, a fell in Lancashire, England
Parlick Fell cheese, made near the fell in Lancashire, England